Stanislaus "Stan" Steinbichler (born January 9th, 2002 in Salzburg) is an actor from Austria.

Life 
Steinbichler played various roles in Austrian children's TV series and movies and appeared in several plays. In 2019, he played Stefan Wolf in one episode of the TV series Vienna Blood, before being cast in 2020 for the role of Nico Haas in the Netflix series "Zero Chill", directed by Angelo Abela and Tessa Hoffe.
2021 he appeared as Mitteregger in the movie "Der Fuchs" under direction by Adrian Goiginger.

He graduated from Danube International School Vienna in 2020.

Filmography 

 2016: 
 2017: Siebzehn
 2017: Trakehnerblut – Das Vermächtnis 2
 2018: SOKO Donau – Herz aus Stein
 2019: Vienna Blood
 2019: Blind ermittelt – Das Haus der Lügen
 2019: Der Bergdoktor
 2020: Familiensache ORF
 2020: Soko Kitzbühel - Home Invasion
 2021: Landkrimi - Das Flammenmädchen
 2021: SOKO Donau - Alter Ego
 2019–2021: Zero Chill - Netflix Series
2021: Die Toten von Salzburg
2021: Der Fuchs

External links 

 
 Stan Steinbichler in The Artists Partnership
 Stan Steinbichler in Crew United
 Homepage of Stan Steinbichler

References 

Austrian actors
2002 births
Living people